The Ariège Pointer is a French breed of hunting dog of pointer type. It originates in the Ariège département of Occitanie, in south-western France. The breed name may be rendered in English as Ariège Pointing Dog or Braque de l'Ariège.

History and use 
The dog type used by hunters in the Ariège département of Occitanie was said to be descended from dogs that were crosses of the Perdiguero de Burgos and the Bracco Italiano.

In 1990 a team of breeders decided to devote themselves to the Braque de l'Ariège's survival. In particular we have Mr. Alain Deteix to thank for the survival of the breed. He headed that team of breeders and wholeheartedly devoted himself to the revival of part of France's National heritage.

It is well suited to hunting wild hare and partridge.

Appearance 

The Braque de l'Ariège is a normally proportioned dog with drop ears. The tail is traditionally docked. The coat is short and primarily white, speckled with larger patches of colours described as orange, liver, or chestnut on the head and ears. Dogs of the breed should appear powerful but without excessive heaviness, robust and of strong. It is quick and energetic. It is also very independent so needs regular training and activity.

See also
 Dogs portal
 List of dog breeds

References

External links
Club du Braque de l'ariège - in french

FCI breeds
Dog breeds originating in France
Rare dog breeds
Gundogs
Pointers